Betsako is a town and commune in Madagascar. It belongs to the district of Mahajanga II, which is a part of Boeny. The population of the commune was estimated to be approximately 7,000 in a 2001 commune census.

Only primary schooling is available. The majority (94%) of the population of the commune are farmers.  The most important crop is tomatoes, while other important products are mangoes, cassava and sweet potatoes.  Services provide employment for 1% of the population. Additionally fishing employs 5% of the population.

References and notes 

Populated places in Boeny